Chuya Belki (Chuyskye byelki) is a mountainous region in the Altai, Altai Republic, Russia. There are a number of glaciers on the northern part of the slopes of the main ridges. The Chuya Belki are named after the Chuya River and after their "Belki" type of ridges.

Description
The Chuya Belki consist of two ranges that are connected:

Northern Chuya Range, highest point  ( according to other sources).
Southern Chuya Range, highest point  

See also
List of mountains and hills of Russia
Saylyugemsky National Park

References

External links
Горы Алтая. Очерк В.В. Сапожникова

Altai Mountains